The Glion Institute of Higher Education (informally Glion) is a private hospitality management school with campuses in Switzerland and the United Kingdom. It is owned by Eurazeo, a private equity firm based in Paris, and it forms part of the education group Sommet Education.

History
Established in 1962 as the Institut International de Glion, the school was founded by Swiss professors Walter Hunziker and Frédéric Tissot on the site of the former Grand Hôtel Bellevue, in Montreux, Switzerland, with the initial class consisting of 15 students from five different countries, studying courses delivered in French.

In 1977, Glion changed its name to the Centre International de Glion (CIG), before becoming Glion Hotel School. In 1989 a second campus was opened in Bulle. In 2002, Glion updated its name to Glion Institute of Higher Education and became part of Laureate Education, an American education company.

In 2006, Glion was accredited by the New England Commission of Higher Education (NECHE) (formerly the Commission on Institutions of Higher Education of the New England Association of Schools and Colleges, Inc.).

In 2013, Glion opened a new campus in London, located in the grounds of the University of Roehampton. In 2016, Glion was acquired by Eurazeo, a multinational private equity firm based in Paris, France. Glion operates under the umbrella of hospitality education group Sommet Education.

Governance 
The Glion Board of Directors comprises leadership group, governing board and advisory board. The leadership group is responsible for maintaining day-to-day quality across the three campuses. The Governing Board has the objective to review the school’s mission, assure quality and integrity, review major changes in the curriculum, endorse strategic planning, monitor financial data and assess the Managing Director’s performance. The advisory board is composed of professionals holding key positions in the hospitality industry and related service industries. Their main role is to advise the school about the evolution and trends of the hospitality and tourism industry.

As of 2022, Glion comprises seven faculties: Finance, Business and Management; Marketing, Event Management and Luxury; Entrepreneurship and Innovation; Practical Arts; Hospitality Management; and General Education. The 97 current faculty members represent 17 nationalities and bring an average of 13 years’ hospitality industry experience and 12 years’ academic experience.

Key dates 

2016 to present : In 2016, Glion London campus moved to a new building named Downshire House, on the campus of the University of Roehampton. In 2016 Eurazeo acquired Glion Institute of Higher Education (Glion) and its interests in affiliated campuses and partners. In 2017 Major renovations took place on Glion campus, ahead of the formal opening of Le Bellevue fine-dining restaurant to the public early the following year. In 2018 Glion ranked 1st for employer reputation in Hospitality Management in the QS World University Rankings. In 2018 Announced an expanded portfolio of four Master’s programs. In 2019 Launched three new Master’s programs, namely: Luxury Management & Guest Experience; Hospitality, Innovation & Entrepreneurship; and Real Estate, Finance & Hotel Development. In 2020 Introduced new remote learning platform “Glion Connect” to feature live online tutorials, demonstrations, one-to-one coaching and mentoring. In 2021 Welcomed Swiss-born chef Stéphane Décotterd with the launch of Maison Décotterd on Glion campus, bringing a new local gastronomy to our students and the public. In 2022 Celebrated 60-year anniversary.

2000  to 2015 : In 2000, the first BBA was introduced, as well as the Associate Degree, Certificate and Diploma programs, while also signing a partnership with Endicott College in Massachusetts (USA) in order to offer two specialized Master’s degrees. In 2001 Glion secured accreditation from New England Association of Schools and Colleges (NEASC) - since renamed the New England Commission of Higher Education (NECHE). In 2002 Changed name to ‘‘Glion Institute of Higher Education’’. In 2002 Became a part of Laureate Hospitality Education, a division of Laureate Education, Inc. Based in Baltimore (USA). In 2004 The HOSTA campus in Leysin was closed. In 2006 Accredited by the New England Commission of Higher Education (formerly the Commission on Institutions of Higher Education of the New England Association of Schools and Colleges, Inc.). In 2008 An all-online MBA in International Hospitality and Service Industries Management was launched, as well as the Bachelor’s in Events, Sports and Entertainment. In 2009 Glion acquired Hotel des Alpes - the new practical arts teaching facility that incorporated renovated rooms, reception, a bar, an academic restaurant and an open kitchen. In 2010 Together with the sister-school Les Roches, Glion created the Les Roches Gruyère University of Applied Sciences (LRGUAS) – a Swiss-accredited program that ran until 2016. In 2011 Launched 100% online postgraduate and professional development certificate and diploma programs. In 2012 Celebrated 50-year anniversary. In 2012 The new eco-friendly educational building was opened – the Academic Center on Bulle campus. In 2013 Glion established the London campus which enabled it to become the first Swiss hospitality school with a presence in the UK capital. In 2014 Launched multicampus options for undergraduate and postgraduate programs, offering student mobility between campuses in Switzerland and London. In 2015 Won the “Best Hospitality Management School” at the Worldwide Hospitality Awards, and it launched the new Luxury Brand Management specialization.

1985 to 1998 : In 1985, founding member of the Swiss Hotel Schools Association. In 1989 Bulle campus opened its doors on July 31st. In 1992 The very first class in English was given to the students - all teaching at Glion and Bulle campuses had been in French until this point. In 1994 Glion opened its first campus outside Switzerland – located in Corfu, the new venture was named The European Center for Tourism Studies (ECTS) and its last student graduated in 2011. In 1995 The first hospitality Bachelor’s degree was launched – called Galaxy, this three-year program paved the way for Glion’s contemporary Bachelor’s in International Hospitality Business; Glion also welcomed the Nobel prize winner Mr. Gorbachev. In 1996 Semesters were split more distinctly between Glion and Bulle campuses, setting a pattern that can still be found today within the Bachelor’s program. In 1997 Glion purchased La Résidence in Glion village in order to offer another practical arts venue to the students. In 1998 The HOSTA school in Leysin joined the renamed Glion Group SA, giving Glion three campuses in Switzerland.

1962 to 1979 - In 1962, founded as the hotel school ‘Institut International de Glion’, The Centre International de Formation Hôtelière et Touristique S.A. was incorporated, with a teaching campus on the site of the former Bellevue & Belvedere Grand Hotel. In1964 The Alumni Association of Glion (AAG) was first formed by 5 students, which was known as the Glion Students’ Association (AEIG) at that time. In 1965 First ‘preparatory course’ was taught – today called Practical Arts. In 1967 Student Government Association was created. In 1971 The Société d’Expansion Touristique S.A. (SET) assumed responsibility for the school administration. In 1976 Glion introduced a choice of four specializations: Financial management, Hospitality management, Food and beverage, and Business management. In 1977 changed new official name to “Centre International de Glion”. In 1978 The Glion campus began to resemble the size and shape known today with the construction of Building IV. In 1979 Glion’s flagship diploma program underwent a significant restructuring – students could opt to specialize in either hospitality management or tourism management in their third semester.

Academic programs
Glion offers Bachelor’s and Master’s degree programs and short programs. All programs are in English.

The Bachelor’s degree program, namely International Hospitality Business, features applied practical and academic courses. This BBA program includes five semesters of study with two six-month professional internships, in a total duration of 3.5 years. Students begin with a full Practical Arts semester in Glion main campus. Towards the final semester, students can choose one of three specializations: Luxury Brand Strategy, International Hotel Development and Finance, or International Event Management.

Glion offers a summer program, together with a specialized English language program. The programs are available in both Switzerland and London. The summer program is designed to provide an introduction to hospitality for individuals aged between 15 and 19 years old. The English language program is optional.

Glion offers 4 Master's degree programs available on campus or remotely across two academic semesters, followed by a six-month internship or a Business Research Project.

The MSc in International Hospitality Business is offered in both Switzerland (Bulle campus) and London campuses. The MSc in Hospitality, Entrepreneurship, and Innovation and MSc in Luxury Management and Guest Experience are only exclusively available in Switzerland. The London campus offers the MSc in Real Estate, Finance and Hotel Development.

The Glion Luxury Hospitality Summer Program is a one-week program which students will be able to join academic masterclasses in service excellence and operations, as well as practical workshops in gastronomy, fine wines and cocktail mixology.

Accreditation
Glion is accredited by the New England Commission of Higher Education (NECHE) (formerly the Commission on Institutions of Higher Education of the New England Association of Schools and Colleges, Inc.).

Memberships
Glion is member of the  AACSB.

Glion has undergone an educational oversight monitoring visit by the Quality Assurance Agency for Higher Education.

Rankings
Globally, Glion is ranked among the Top 3 institutions for Hospitality and Leisure Management, and number 2 for employer reputation, according to the 2021 QS World University Rankings by Subject.

Campuses & student life
Today Glion has three campuses: two in Switzerland and one in London. The main campus is located in Montreux, Switzerland. The second campus is located in Bulle, in the district of Gruyère, while the third campus is located in the University of Roehampton in London, United Kingdom.

The Glion main campus overlooks the city of Montreux, positioned in Glion-sur-Montreux with a panorama view of Lake Geneva and the Swiss Alps. The Glion campus is a practical arts learning centre for Bachelor’s semester 1 students. Montreux (1 km/0.62 miles) and Lausanne (24 km/15 miles) are nearby, as is Geneva International Airport (66 km/41 miles). Glion main campus has 5 student accommodation buildings, 16 classrooms and study rooms, library, gastronomic restaurant (Maison Décotterd), the Bistro, self-service restaurant with panoramic terrace  (The Club), lounge bar, gymnasium and fitness room.

The Bulle campus is located in the town of Bulle in the Gruyère region of Switzerland. Opened in 1989, the Bulle campus accommodates 700 students in 4 residential buildings. As Glion’s primary academic center, the campus facilities include 16 classrooms and study rooms, a library, study area, self-service restaurant and a lounge bar.
Opened in 2013, Glion London is situated in the grounds of the University of Roehampton. It remains the only UK campus established by a Swiss hospitality institution. The London campus has its own dedicated campus building in Downshire House. Glion students are able to use the University of Roehampton's resources and facilities. Academic study options include Bachelor’s and Master’s Program. The Bachelor’s Program mirrors the Bachelor’s in International Hospitality Business  in Switzerland, but for the first Practical Arts semester all students will have their classes in Glion campus. For Master’s programs, there are 2 available in London campus: the MSc in International Hospitality Business which is also available in Switzerland, and in addition the MSc in Real Estate, Finance and Hotel Development is taught exclusively in London. 

Glion has more than 1600 students representing 98 nationalities. This represents a very diversified study environment in Glion, where students could meet different people around the world and form a student community. Glion students can also travel all around Switzerland as the Student Affairs team organizes all kinds of day trips for students during the weekends.  

Glion students run a number of specialist committees: 

 Glion Sport Committee: a gateway to every activity on campus,
 Glion Green Committee: teaches students how to become more sustainable in innovative and engaging ways
 Glion Graduation Committee: led by the graduating semester to set up graduation ceremony gala and arrange events to bring students together.
 Glion Charity Committee: aims to provide Glion students with an opportunity to make a quantifiable difference while providing continuity and monetary aid to  the chosen community
 Glion Culinary Committee: enhances dining experience of various cuisines  and beverages
 Glion Arts Committee: serves two major purposes, one to showcase talent of any kind within students across the Glion campuses; and help other committees and faculty deliver engaging events.
 Glion Wine Committee:  develops knowledge on the topic while spending time with other students by sharing a glass of wine together, attending a wine tasting with professionals, or visiting a local winery
 Glion Networking Committee:  makes it possible for students to network with professionals. GNC organizes industry visits, hosts conferences and looks after external guests

Glion Student Government Association: It is elected by the Glion student body to represent their best interests. The association is spread across both Switzerland and Glion London, and they all work together to ensure they achieve the same goals. This is, among others, to continue promoting and enhancing the ‘Glion Spirit’, through various projects and events, and improving the overall student experience.

Alumni 
Glion Institute of Higher Education has more than 15,700 alumni. 

The Alumni Association of Glion, or Association des Anciens de Glion (AAG), is the official networking community for Glion graduates. The AAG hosts a series of events worldwide, offering career support and leadership advice to its members. It is the representative body for the Glion Alumni Community.

References 

Educational institutions established in 1967
Hospitality schools in Switzerland